The 2018 CME Group Tour Championship was the eighth CME Group Tour Championship, a women's professional golf tournament and the season-ending event on the U.S.-based LPGA Tour. It was played at the Gold Course of Tiburón Golf Club in Naples, Florida.

The CME Group Tour Championship also marked the end of the season-long "Race to the CME Globe" in 2018. Each player's season-long "Race to the CME Globe" points were "reset" before the tournament based on their position in the points list. "Championship points" were awarded to the top 40 players in the CME Group Tour Championship which were added to their "reset points" to determine the overall winner of the "Race to the CME Globe". The event was televised by Golf Channel Thursday through Saturday on a 2-hour delay, and ABC Sunday live.

Lexi Thompson won the tournament by four strokes over Nelly Korda, while Ariya Jutanugarn won the Race to the CME Globe and took the $1,000,000 bonus.

Format

Qualification
Called the "CME Group Titleholders" for its first three editions, qualification for the tournament changed for 2014. Previously, the top three finishers in each tournament, not previously qualified, earned entry to the tournament. For 2014 the field was determined by a season-long points race, the "Race to the CME Globe". All players making the cut in a tournament earned points, with 500 points going to the winner. The five major championships had a higher points distribution, with 625 points to the winner. No-cut tournaments only awarded points to the top 40 finishers.

Only LPGA members were eligible to earn points. The top 72 players on the "Race to the CME Globe" points list gained entry into the CME Group Titleholders Championship as well as any tournament winners, whether or not an LPGA member, not in the top 72.

Field
1. Top 72 LPGA members and those tied for 72nd on the "Race to the CME Globe" Points Standings

Marina Alex, Brittany Altomare, Aditi Ashok, Céline Boutier, Chella Choi, Chun In-gee, Carlota Ciganda, Jacqui Concolino, Lindy Duncan, Austin Ernst, Jodi Ewart Shadoff, Hannah Green, Jaye Marie Green, Georgia Hall, Nasa Hataoka, Brooke Henderson, Wei-Ling Hsu, Charley Hull, Ji Eun-hee, Ariya Jutanugarn, Moriya Jutanugarn, Danielle Kang, Haeji Kang, Cristie Kerr, Megan Khang, Kim Sei-young, Katherine Kirk, Ko Jin-young, Lydia Ko, Jessica Korda, Nelly Korda, Bronte Law, Minjee Lee, Lee Jeong-eun, Lee Mi-hyang, Mirim Lee, Brittany Lincicome, Pernilla Lindberg, Yu Liu, Gaby López, Mo Martin, Caroline Masson, Ally McDonald, Azahara Muñoz, Anna Nordqvist, Su-Hyun Oh, Amy Olson, Ryann O'Toole, Annie Park, Jane Park, Park Sung-hyun, Pornanong Phatlum, Ryu So-yeon, Lizette Salas, Jenny Shin, Sarah Jane Smith, Mariah Stackhouse, Thidapa Suwannapura, Emma Talley, Lexi Thompson, Ayako Uehara, Angel Yin

Qualified but did not play: Shanshan Feng, Sandra Gal, Caroline Inglis, Kim Hyo-joo, In-Kyung Kim, Inbee Park, Jennifer Song, Angela Stanford, Michelle Wie, Amy Yang

2. LPGA Members, not otherwise qualified, who won at least one official LPGA tournament during the season

None

3. Non-members who won at least one official LPGA tournament during the season

None

4. Those beyond 72nd on the "Race to the CME Globe" Points Standings to fill the field to 72 players

Ashleigh Buhai, Pei-Yun Chien, Daniela Holmqvist, Tiffany Joh, Wichanee Meechai, Park Hee-young, Pannarat Thanapolboonyaras, Maria Torres, Mariajo Uribe, Sakura Yokomine

Qualified but did not play: Mina Harigae

Nationalities in the field

Race to the CME Globe

Reset points
Each player's "Race to the CME Globe" points were "reset" before the tournament based on their position in the "Race to the CME Globe" points list. The leader was given 5,000 points, the player in second place 4,500 down to 10 points for the player in 72nd place.

Final points
"Championship points" were awarded to the top 40 players in the CME Group Tour Championship which were added to their "reset points" to determine the overall winner. The winner of the CME Group Tour Championship receiver 3,500 points, the second place player 2,450, down to 150 points for the player finishing in 40th place. The effect of the points system is that the top five players in the reset points list prior to the Championship would be guaranteed to win the "Race to the CME Globe" by winning the Championship. The top 12 in the reset points list would have a chance of winning the Race depending on the performances of other players.

Bonus
The winner of the "Race to the CME Globe" receives a $1 million bonus that does not count toward official money list, while second place and third place receive $150,000 and $100,000, respectively.

Final leaderboard
Sunday, November 18, 2018

References

External links

Coverage on LPGA Tour's official site

2018 CME Group Tour Championship
2018 CME Group Tour Championship
2018 in women's golf
2018 in American women's sports
2018 in sports in Florida
November 2018 sports events in the United States